The Malagasy brush warbler (Nesillas typica), also known as the Madagascar brush-warbler, is a species of Old World warbler in the family Acrocephalidae.  It is found in Comoros and Madagascar.  Its natural habitats are subtropical or tropical dry forests, subtropical or tropical moist lowland forests, and subtropical or tropical moist shrubland.

Gallery

References

Malagasy brush warbler
Birds of the Comoros
Birds of Madagascar
Malagasy brush warbler
Taxonomy articles created by Polbot